WDVH (980 kHz) is a commercial AM radio station in Gainesville, Florida, broadcasting to the Gainesville-Ocala radio market.  It is owned by MARC Radio and broadcasts an Urban oldies-leaning urban adult contemporary radio format, mainly focusing on R&B hits from the 1970s, 80s and 90s, while also playing some newer songs.  It calls itself "R&B 94.1."

By day, WDVH is powered at 5,000 watts, non-directional; to protect other stations on 980 AM from interference, at night it greatly reduces power to 166 watts.  Programming is also heard on 250 watt FM translator W231DH at 94.1 MHz in Gainesville.

History
WDVH signed on the air on in October 1955 from its current transmitter location on SE 27th Street (formerly known as Kincaid Road).  The call sign stands for the three partners who launched the station, Toby Dowdy, Rob Vaughn and Tom Hanson.  Toby Dowdy was a country radio musician, Rob Vaughn owned the land and Tom Hanson was a radio station manager.  Initially WDVH was a daytime-only station, required to go off the air at sunset.

In the mid-1950s, it became a Top 40 hits outlet and added a second tower to give it night time service to much of Gainesville.  Around 1968, both towers collapsed in a storm and only one tower was replaced, making it a non-directional daytime station again.

WDVH was sold in 1969 to Roy Danner (of Shoney's restaurant fame) and Larry Edwards.  On May 1, 1970, the format changed to country music.

On June 30, 1980, the studio building burned down due to an electrical fire.  Temporary studios were installed next to the transmitting tower in a double wide trailer while a new permanent studio building was built in place of the old one.

In April 1988, WWLO (1430 AM, now WTMN) was diplexed onto the WDVH tower.  WWLO first went on the air with 2.5 kW daytime only.  That station increased its power to 10 kW daytime, 45 watts nighttime in July 2003.

WDVH was sold again, this time to Bill Morris, who in turn sold it to Crystal which became Pinnacle AM Broadcasting, Inc.  The format changed to Adult Standards and the call letters were changed to WLUS in 1996 (US98).  In 2000, the transmitter and computer automation equipment was seized by the Alachua County Sheriff's department for failure to pay unrelated business debts.  This equipment was bought at auction by morning show host, Jim Brand with the hopes that it could be re-installed, quickly returning the station to the air.

When station ownership had more financial problems, the transmitter was sold to a religious broadcaster in St. Louis, Missouri.  The station remained dark for nearly eight months while a sale was arranged to Pamal Broadcasting.  This sale was consummated in late 2000 after Pinnacle installed a new transmitter.

When Pamal Broadcasting took over, it combined the studios of WKZY and WHHZ in the WDVH studio building.  WDVH's format remained Adult Standards until 2004, when it was changed to Classic Country.  It was simulcast with co-owned 101.7 WDVH-FM under the slogan "WDVH Country legends, 101.7 FM and 980 AM".

In 2005 the studios were moved across town to the Sunshine Broadcasting building on 100 NW 76th Drive (Tower Hill office park) along with WTMN, WTMG, WKZY, WHHZ and WDVH-FM.  For the next six years, WDVH continued with Classic Country and tradio shows on weekends.

In late October 2011, WDVH became "Florida's Fox News Radio 980 & 720" changing format to talk radio with Fox News Radio updates.

On May 1, 2016, WDVH changed its format back to a simulcast of classic country-formatted WDVH-FM.  On September 6, 2016, WDVH rebranded as "I am Country 94.1 & 101.7".

On August 14, 2017, WDVH rebranded as "I am Country 106.9", after the format and "I am Country" branding relocated on FM to WPLL. (WDVH-FM was sold at that time to the Radio Training Network, becoming a simulcast of Bradenton station WJIS.)

On October 16, 2019, WDVH/W231DH split from its FM sister and flipped to Urban Oldies as "R&B 94.1," with an emphasis on R&B/Hip-Hop hits from the 1970s, 1980s, and 1990s.

Previous logo

References

External links
R & B 94.1 Facebook
Marc Radio Website

DVH
Radio stations established in 1955
1955 establishments in Florida
Urban oldies radio stations in the United States